Rui Naiwei (born December 28, 1963) is a Chinese professional Go player, once active in South Korea. She is probably the strongest recorded female Go player, and is the only woman to have won one of the major open Go titles. She achieved this by winning the 1999 Guksu title (the oldest and one of the most prestigious Go competitions in Korea), on the way beating Lee Chang-Ho and Cho Hun-hyun, the two strongest players in the world at the time.

Biography 
Rui was born in Shanghai, China. After starting to play around 1975 (at the age of 11—the age some other players go pro) she became a pro for the Zhongguo Qiyuan in 1985, being promoted all the way to 7-dan that year. She reached 9-dan in 1988, becoming the first woman ever to achieve that rank. After that, Chinese Feng Yun and Korean Park Jieun became the second and third female go players to reach 9 dan, following Rui Naiwei.

Leaving China in 1989, she moved to Japan. While the Nihon Ki-in did not allow her to play in any Japanese tournaments, she was able to make it to the semi-finals of the international Ing Cup in 1992. She spent several years in the San Francisco Bay Area.

She then moved to South Korea (with the help of Cho Hun-hyeon 9-dan). She participated actively in Korean tournaments. She dominated the women's events and won two open events, always previously won by men: the Guksu (the 43rd open Guksu title in South Korea, 1999) and the Maxim Cup (2004).

She returned to China in 2011.

Rui's style tends to be extremely aggressive, and often characterized by large scale semeai.

Her husband is Jiang Zhujiu, also a 9-dan professional.

Titles & runners-up 
Ranks #6-t in total number of titles in Korea.

References

External links
Go Base
MSO World
Rui Naiwei - Biographical link on Sensei's library
Korea Baduk Association profile (in Korean)

1963 births
Living people
Go players from Shanghai
Asian Games medalists in go
Go players at the 2010 Asian Games
Asian Games silver medalists for China
Medalists at the 2010 Asian Games
Female Go players